Enric Pladevall (born 1951 in Vic) is a Catalan sculptor.

Biography 
Pladevall was born in 1951 in Vic, Barcelona and in 1968 he entered Barcelona's Fine Arts school.  His prolific career as a sculptor is acknowledged with important scholarships and awards. His artistic accomplishments are well established in both national and international fields. His work has been exhibited at Barcelona's Fundació Joan Miró, the Maeght gallery as well as in Italy, France, South Africa, Singapore, Australia, the United States and Japan. He has got public sculptures in Korea, Barcelona, Vic, Manresa, Reus, El Prat de Llobregat and Girona. Some of his most valued sculptures are Androgyne Planet at Atlanta's Centennial Olympic Park, and L'arbre de la Vida ("The tree of life"), at Barcelona's Cosmocaixa.  Also, Pladevall's sculptures can be found at museums worldwide, such as MACBA, Museo Reina Sofia, Cuenca's Museo de Arte Abstracto Español, Fundación Juan March, The Lehigh Art Gallery Museum of Pennsylvania, the Atlanta History Center or the Urban Redevelopment Authority Collection in Singapore.

References 

Living people
1951 births
Sculptors from Catalonia
People from Vic